Elmer Russell "Jack" Knight (January 12, 1895 – July 30, 1976) was an American right-handed pitcher in Major League Baseball. Born in Pittsboro, Mississippi, he played from 1922 to 1927, pitching in 72 games for the St. Louis Cardinals, Philadelphia Phillies and Boston Braves.

He worked as a minor-league manager for the Cleveland Indians, Brooklyn Dodgers, and Chicago Cubs for several years after his playing career ended. He died at age 81 in San Antonio, Texas.

External links

1895 births
1976 deaths
Atlanta Crackers players
Baseball players from Mississippi
Boston Braves players
Brooklyn Dodgers scouts
Chattanooga Lookouts players
Cleveland Indians scouts
Des Moines Demons players
Dyersburg Deers players
Fargo-Moorhead Twins players
Galveston Pirates players
Galveston Sand Crabs players
Houston Buffaloes players
Little Rock Travelers players
Longview Cannibals players
Major League Baseball pitchers
Millsaps Majors baseball players
Minor league baseball managers
People from Calhoun County, Mississippi
Philadelphia Phillies players
Portland Beavers players
Pueblo Braves players
St. Louis Cardinals players
San Francisco Seals (baseball) players
Seattle Indians players
Zanesville Dodgers players